FC Vaynakh Shali was a Russian football team from Shali. It played professionally in 1991 and 1992. Their best result was 20th place in the Zone 1 of the Russian Second Division in 1992.

External links
  Team history at KLISF

Association football clubs established in 1991
Association football clubs disestablished in 1993
Defunct football clubs in Russia
Sport in Chechnya
1991 establishments in Russia
1993 disestablishments in Russia